Gareth Owen is a multiple Olivier & Tony Award-winning sound designer specialising in musical theatre in London's West End, on Broadway and internationally.

Early life

Gareth John Owen was born in Sheffield, United Kingdom, a son of two teachers, both of whom specialised in special needs education. At the age of nine the family moved to the Cayman Islands where Owen attended Cayman Islands Middle School. Upon returning to the UK the family moved to St. Ives in Cornwall where Owen attended both Mounts Bay School and Penwith Sixth Form College before going to Plymouth University in Plymouth, to study for a bachelor's degree in underwater science. While at university he worked in nightclubs as a lighting and sound engineer, and as a boatman and beach lifeguard in St. Ives.

Career

Owen initially began working in live sound when the Penzance nightclub he was working at started to present live bands which Owen was asked to mix. From here he secured work with Birmingham's SSE Audio Group which lead to an early career in rock & roll, working at festivals such as Glastonbury, Reading, Party in the Park, and T4 on the Beach; and mixing acts such as Def Leppard, The Stereophonics, B B King, The Spice Girls and The Rolling Stones.

Owens theatre career began when he was invited to mix the musical The Blues Brothers which was running at what is now the Trafalgar Studios in Londons west end. About this time, Owen is quoted as saying in an interview "I didn't have a lot of money so I bought a tent and lived in the band's garden". From here he was offered a job as sound designer for the UK tour of Stephen Schwartz' musical Godspell, beginning a collaboration which would continue until the present day. Owen went on to design a number of shows in a freelance capacity, before joining London's Orbital Sound as a full-time sound designer. In late 2009, Owen left Orbital Sound and formed his own company, Gareth Owen Sound.

Since 2010, Owen has since worked with composers including Alan Menken, Andrew Lloyd Webber, Stephen Schwartz, Björn Ulvaeus, Glen Ballard, Max Martin, David Bryan, George Stiles, Cyndi Lauper, Alan Silvestri and Stephen Sondheim. Owen has also created musicals based on the music of pop icons such as Michael Jackson, Donna Summer, and The Beatles; and is a collaborator with top directors including Robert De Niro, Christopher Ashley, Jerry Zaks, Des McAnuff, Luke Sheppard, Jerry Mitchell, Laurence Connor, Christopher Wheeldon, Terry Johnson, Scott Schwartz, Michael Arden and Sir Trevor Nunn.

Broadway musical theatre

Owen has worked as sound designer on the following Broadway productions in New York City:

 Bad Cinderella, (original creative), Imperial Theater (2023)
 & Juliet, (original creative), The Stephen Sondheim Theatre (2022)
 MJ the Musical, (original creative), Neil Simon Theater (2022)
 Diana, (original creative), Longacre Theater (2020)
 Summer (original creative), Lunt Fontaine Theater (2018)
 Come From Away (original creative), Schoenfeld Theater (2017)
 A Bronx Tale (original creative), Longacre Theater (2016)
 Spring Awakening, Brooks Atkinson Theater (2015)
 Let it Be (original creative), St. James Theater (2013)
 End of the Rainbow (original creative), Belasco Theater (2012)
 A Little Night Music, Walter Kerr Theater (2009)

West End musical theatre

Owen has worked as sound designer on the following West End musical productions in London:
 Elf, Dominion Theatre (2022)
 Back to the Future, (original creative), Adelphi Theatre (2021)
 Cinderella, (original creative), Gillian Lynne Theatre (2021)
 Prince of Egypt, (original creative), Dominion Theatre (2020)
 & Juliet, (original creative), Shaftesbury Theatre (2019)
 Mamma Mia! the Party, (original creative), O2 Arena (2019)
 Joseph and the Amazing Technicolor Dreamcoat, Palladium Theatre (2019 & 2021)
 Strictly Ballroom, (original creative), Piccadilly Theatre (2017)
 Bat Out of Hell, (original creative), Coliseum Theatre (2017)
 Young Frankenstein, Garrick Theatre (2017)
 42nd Street, Drury Lane Theatre (2017)
 Wind in the Willows, (original creative), Palladium Theatre (2016)
 Mrs Henderson Presents, (original creative), Noël Coward Theatre (2015)
 In the Heights, Kings Cross Theatre (2015)
 Memphis, Shaftesbury Theatre (2014)
 Forbidden Broadway, Vaudeville Theatre (2014)
 I Can't Sing, (original creative), Palladium Theatre (2014)
 Merrily We Roll Along, Comedy Theatre (2013)
 Midnight Tango, Phoenix Theatre (2013)
 Let it Be, (original creative), Prince of Wales Theatre (2012)
 Top Hat, (original creative), Aldwych Theatre (2011)
 Fame, Shaftesbury Theatre (2010)
 Sweet Charity, Haymarket Theatre (2009)
 Shout!, Arts Theatre (2009)
 A Little Night Music, Garrick Theatre (2008)
 La Cage Aux Follies, Playhouse Theatre (2008)
 Carousel, Savoy Theatre (2008)
 Fiddler on the Roof, Savoy Theatre (2007)
 Little Shop of Horrors, Duke of Yorks Theatre (2007)
 Footloose, Novello Theatre (2006)
 High Society, Shaftesbury Theatre (2005)
 The Big Life, (original creative), Apollo Theatre (2005)

International and regional musical theatre
Owen has worked as sound designer on the following productions around the world:

 Bat Out of Hell, (original creative), The Paris Theatre, Las Vegas (2022)
 Kinky Boots, Stage 42, New York (2022)
 Starlight Express Bochum, Germany (2018)
 Clueless, (original creative), Signature Theater, Off-Broadway (2018)
 The Secret Garden, The Lincoln Center, New York (2017)
 Schikaneder, (original creative) Vienna (2016)
 Bodyguard, Netherlands (2015)
 Secret Cinema - The Empire Strikes Back, London (2015)
 Disney's Hunchback of Notre Dame, (original creative), worldwide (2014)
 Moeder ik wil bij de revue, (original creative), Netherlands (2014)
 Disney's Beauty & The Beast worldwide (2014)
 Disney's The Little Mermaid worldwide (2012)
 Sister Act (2011)
 Hairspray (2010)
 High School Musical Two, (original creative) (2009)
 Flashdance, (original creative) (2009)

West End straight plays 

Owen has worked as sound designer on the following West End straight plays in London, although the timeline suggests he is no longer active in this particular discipline:
 Barking in Essex, (original creative), Wyndhams Theatre (2013)
 Uncle Vanya, Vaudeville Theatre (2012)
 Long Days Journey in to Night, Apollo Theatre (2012)
 Sign of the Times, (original creative), Duchess Theatre (2011)
 End of the Rainbow, (original creative), Trafalgar Theatre (2010)
 Woman in Black, Fortune Theatre (2010)
 An Ideal Husband, Vaudeville Theatre (2010)
 Prick Up Your Ears, (original creative), Comedy Theatre (2009)
 Dealers Choice, Trafalgar Theatre (2007)
 Jeffery Bernard is Unwell, Garrick Theatre (2006)
 Dickens Unplugged!, Comedy Theatre (2008)
 Epitaph for George Dillon, Comedy Theatre (2005)

Technical achievements 

Owen is credited with a long list of technical achievements and industry firsts.

A pioneer in the field of immersive theatre sound, Owen was the first person to use the object based wave field synthesis immersive audio in both Londons West End and on New Yorks Broadway, for the musicals Come from Away and Diana, respectively. He created the world's first sound design to incorporate object based mixing in to a rotating auditorium for Andrew Lloyd Webbers Cinderella musical at the Gillian Lynne Theatre in London; and what was, at the time, the largest SoundScape installation in the world for arena musical Starlight Express. Owen is also credited as the first person to integrate wireless tracking of performers in to an object based sound system on Broadway, this time for MJ the Musical. Indeed, he and his team are credited with creating one of the industry standard control applications for live immersive audio, d&b's EnSnap, used on multiple shows and productions around the world.

Owen's use and development of cutting-edge technologies is not limited to immersive audio. He is believed to have designed the show with the largest number of radio mics ever used on a west end musical, 42nd Street at Londons Drury Lane. He was the first person to use the d&b KSL line array system on a west end musical for Back to the Future at the Adelphi theatre, and was the first person to use the d&b XSL line array system on a Broadway show, this time for & Juliet at the Sondheim theater. Owen was the first person to use a DiGiCo mixing console in theatre, the now defunct D5, for the UK Tour of the Cliff Richard musical Summer Holiday. He is credited as being the first to use both the Avid Venue mixing console and the Avid S6L mixing console in theatre, for the shows Annie Get Your Gun and Broadways Come From Away respectively.

Owen is a co-founder of the software house Show Control Ltd, a company specialising in the coding and development of dedicated theatrical show control systems. Owen is co-founder and CCO of audio hardware manufacturer Fourier Audio, where he is "working to redefine the future of pro audio".

Other endeavours

In 2009, Owen joined a steering committee that eventually formed the Association of Sound Designers where he served as a committee member for the maximum term of five years, from 2012 to 2018.

In 2022, Owen was presented with an Honorary Doctorate from the University of Salford.

Selected awards

|-
| 2022
| MJ: The Musical
| Tony Award for Best Sound Design of a Musical
| 
| 
|-
| 2022
| MJ: The Musical
| Drama Desk Award for Best Sound Design of a Musical
| 
|
|-
|2022
|Back to the Future
|Olivier Award for Best Sound Design
|
|
|-
|2022
|Back to the Future
|WhatsOnStage Award for Best Sound Design
|
|
|-
|2020
|Come From Away
|BroadwayWorld Award for Best Sound Design of the Decade
|
|
|-
|2020
|Come From Away
|Green Room Award for Best Sound Design
|
|
|-
|2020
|Come From Away
|WhatsOnStage Award for Best Sound Design
|
|
|-
|2020
|& Juliet
|WhatsOnStage Award for Best Sound Design
|
|
|-
|2019
|Come From Away
|Olivier Award for Best Sound Design
|
|
|-
|2019
|The Donna Summer Musical
| NAACP Theatre Award for Best Sound Larger Theatre
|
|
|-
|2018
|Starlight Express (Bochum) 
| Pro Sound Award for Best Immersive Design 
|
|
|-
|2018
|Carmen La Cubana
|BroadwayWorld Germany Award for Best Sound Design
|
|
|-
|2018
|Bat Out of Hell The Musical
|AV Technology Award for Best Use of Audio Solutions
|
|
|-
|2018
|Come From Away
|BroadwayWorld Toronto Award for Best Original Sound Design
|
|
|-
|2018
|Bat Out of Hell The Musical
|Olivier Award for Best Sound Design
|
|
|-
|2018
|Come From Away
|BroadwayWorld Award for Best Sound Design
|
|
|-
|2018
|Summer
|Craig Noel Award for Best Sound Design
|
|
|-
|2017
|Bat Out of Hell The Musical
|AV Technology Award for Best Sound Design
|
|
|-
|2017
|Come From Away
|Outer Critics Circle Award for Best Sound Design
|
|
|-
|2017
|Bat Out of Hell The Musical
|BroadwayWorld Award for Best Sound Design
|
|
|-
|2017
|Come From Away
|Dora Award for Best Sound Design
|
|
|-
|2017
|Individual Recognition
|Pro Sound Award for Sound Engineer of the Year
|
|
|-
|2017
|Come From Away
|Helen Hayes Award for Best Sound Design
|
|
|-
|2016
|A Bronx Tale
|BroadwayWorld Award for Best Sound Design
|
|
|-
|2015
|Memphis the Musical
|Olivier Award for Best Sound Design
|
|
|-
|2015
| Memphis the Musical
| Pro Sound Award for Best Theatre Sound
| 
|
|-
|2015
|Hunchback of Notre Dame
| BroadwayWorld Award for Best Sound Design
|
|
|-
|2014
|Merrily We Roll Along
|Olivier Award for Best Sound Design
| 
|
|-
|2013
| Top Hat
|Olivier Award for Best Sound Design
| 
|
|-
|2014
| I Can't Sing!
| Pro Sound Award for Best Theatre Sound
| 
|
|-
|2012
| End of the Rainbow
| Tony Award for Best Sound Design of a Musical
| 
|
|-
|2011
| End of the Rainbow
|Olivier Award for Best Sound Design
| 
|
|-
| 2010
| A Little Night Music
| Tony Award for Best Sound Design of a Musical
| 
|

References

External links 

Official site
 
Association of Sound Designers

British sound designers
Broadway sound designers
Living people
1977 births
Alumni of the University of Plymouth
Tony Award winners